Harry J. Aleo (December 7, 1919 – June 21, 2008) was an American businessman and owner of Thoroughbred racehorses. Born in Noe Valley, San Francisco, California, he was a lifelong resident of San Francisco. During World War II, he served overseas with the United States Army, where among his campaigns he fought in the Battle of the Bulge. At war's end, Aleo returned home and founded Twin Peaks Properties, a real estate  and insurance brokerage firm he owned and operated until his death.

In 1979, he became involved in the sport of Thoroughbred horse racing. Throughout his more than two decades in racing, his only trainer was Greg Gilchrist. His most famous horse was the ill-fated Lost in the Fog, who was voted the Eclipse Award as the 2005 American Champion Sprint Horse.

References
 Harry Aleo at the NTRA
 June 25, 2008 Bloodhorse.com article titled Lost in the Fog Owner Harry Aleo Dies

1919 births
2008 deaths
United States Army personnel of World War II
Businesspeople from San Francisco
American racehorse owners and breeders
United States Army soldiers
20th-century American businesspeople